The Oxfordshire Fire and Rescue Service is the fire service serving the county of Oxfordshire, England. It is predominantly an on-call fire service, although also has whole-time support.

Fire and Rescue Service Headquarters is in Kidlington, Oxford, Oxfordshire. This is also the location of the fire service workshops. Oxfordshires control room is now based at Reading, as part of the Thames Valley Fire Control Centre, in partnership with Royal Berkshire and Buckinghamshire Fire and Rescue services. Kidlington's control room now acts as a backup/secondary control in the event of a failure at Reading.

The chief fire officer is Rob MacDougall.

Performance
In 2018/2019, every fire and rescue service in England and Wales was subjected to a statutory inspection by Her Majesty's Inspectorate of Constabulary and Fire & Rescue Services (HIMCFRS). The inspection investigated how well the service performs in each of three areas. On a scale of outstanding, good, requires improvement and inadequate, Oxfordshire Fire and Rescue Service was rated as follows:

Fire stations 

The Oxfordshire Fire and Rescue Service currently operates out of 25 fire stations, three of which are crewed on a wholetime 24-hour basis with retained (on-call) back-up, three stations are day-crewed and retained, and 19 are crewed solely by retained on-call firefighters.

See also
List of British firefighters killed in the line of duty

References

External links
 
Oxfordshire Fire and Rescue Service at HMICFRS

Fire and rescue services of England
Fire and Rescue Service